Sony Music Entertainment India Pvt. Ltd. is the record label operated by Sony in Chennai, India. The company began operation in 1997, and it was the first record company in India to be 100% foreign-owned, with Sony being a Japanese corporation. From December 2013 to March 2020, the company distributed Warner Music Group releases for Indian and SAARC market, until the Warner Music India division was created. Sony Music India is the largest foreign-owned music label in India, and the country's second largest record label overall with up to 25% share of the Indian music market, after T-Series, and ahead of Zee Music which Sony has a partnership with. Sony Music South is affiliated with Sony Music India and it is specifically made for South Indian albums.

Hindi films

Hindi non-films
This is the incomplete list

Tamil films
Sony Music holds the soundtrack rights of above 200 Tamil movies.

Telugu films

Malayalam films

Kannada films

Bengali films

Punjabi films

Punjabi non films

References

Sony Music
Record label distributors
Companies based in Chennai
Indian record labels
Indian music record labels
Record labels established in 1997
1997 establishments in Tamil Nadu
Indian companies established in 1997